Our Lady of Mt. Carmel Church is a historic church building in Albuquerque, New Mexico. It was built in 1870 in a Vernacular Pueblo Revival style. The building was added to the National Register of Historic Places in 1984.

References

External links

Roman Catholic churches in New Mexico
Churches on the National Register of Historic Places in New Mexico
Roman Catholic churches completed in 1870
Roman Catholic churches in Albuquerque, New Mexico
National Register of Historic Places in Albuquerque, New Mexico
Adobe churches in New Mexico
1870 establishments in New Mexico Territory
19th-century Roman Catholic church buildings in the United States
Pueblo Revival architecture in Albuquerque, New Mexico
New Mexico State Register of Cultural Properties